The  is a city tram station located on the Shin-Minato Harbor Line in Imizu, Toyama Prefecture, Japan. This station is unmanned.

Surrounding area
 is located near this station.

Railway stations in Toyama Prefecture